Lauritz Schoof (born 7 October 1990 in Rendsburg) is a German rower. He was part of the German crew that won the gold medal in the men's quadruple sculls at the 2012 Summer Olympics in London.  He also successfully defended the quadruple sculls title at the 2016 Rio Olympics as part of the German team.

Career 
Schoof was successful at junior and under-23 level, winning a silver medal at the World Junior Championships in the men's quadruple sculls (with Mario Jadatz, Christopher Schang and Bastian Bechler), and gold in the junior men's double sculls with Martin Menger, as well as winning gold in the single sculls at the 2009 U23 World Championship.

His first senior World Championship medal came in 2011, when he was part of the German team that won the silver medal behind Australia.  His teammates were Karl Schulze, Philipp Wende and Tim Grohmann.  This was also the team that won gold at the 2012 Summer Olympics.

In 2013, the team of Schoof, Schulze, Grohmann and Paul Heinrich won the European quadruple sculls title.  That team then came second to Croatia at the 2013 World Championships.

In 2015, Schoof, Schulze, Wende and Hans Gruhne won the men's quadruple sculls at the World Championship.  This was the team that retained the Olympic title when the German quadruple sculls team won gold at the 2016 Olympics.

References

External links
 

1990 births
Living people
German male rowers
People from Rendsburg
Rowers at the 2012 Summer Olympics
Rowers at the 2016 Summer Olympics
Olympic rowers of Germany
Olympic gold medalists for Germany
Olympic medalists in rowing
Medalists at the 2012 Summer Olympics
Medalists at the 2016 Summer Olympics
World Rowing Championships medalists for Germany
Sportspeople from Schleswig-Holstein